Guido Andreozzi was the defending champion but lost in the second round to Emilio Gómez.

Thiago Monteiro won the title after defeating Facundo Argüello 3–6, 6–2, 6–3 in the final.

Seeds
All seeds receive a bye into the second round.

Draw

Finals

Top half

Section 1

Section 2

Bottom half

Section 3

Section 4

References
Main draw
Qualifying draw

2019 ATP Challenger Tour
Tennis tournaments in Uruguay
2019 Singles